Rhodopygia hinei, sometimes known by the common name tropical amberwing, is a member of the skimmer family of dragonflies.

Distribution
Rhodopygia hinei is found in Belize, Guatemala, Costa Rica, Panama, and Ecuador.

Description
The abdomen of the male is bright red.

Gallery

References

External links 

Libellulidae
Insects described in 1906